With South Africa now re-established in international sport, its national team made an inaugural tour of Sri Lanka in 1993 and played 3 Tests.  South Africa won the series 1–0 with 2 matches drawn:

Test series summary

1st Test

2nd Test

3rd Test

One Day Internationals (ODIs)

The series was drawn 1-1, with one no-result.

1st ODI

2nd ODI

3rd ODI

1993 in South African cricket
1993 in Sri Lankan cricket
International cricket competitions from 1991–92 to 1994
1993
Sri Lankan cricket seasons from 1972–73 to 1999–2000